Jeremy Ormskerk (born 17 December 1982 in Amsterdam) is a retired Dutch basketball player. Ormskerk played for the Dutch Basketball League teams BS Weert, Amsterdam Astronauts, ZZ Leiden, BC Apollo, Omniworld Almere and Rotterdam Basketbal College during his career. As well, Ormskerk played in 31 games for the Dutch national basketball team.

Honours
Amsterdam Astronauts
Dutch Basketball League (1): 2004–05
NBB Cup (2): 2003–04, 2005–06

References

External links
 eurobasket.com profile

Dutch men's basketball players
Basketball players from Amsterdam
Dutch Basketball League players
1982 births
Living people
B.S. Leiden players
Amsterdam Basketball players
Almere Pioneers players
Apollo Amsterdam players
BSW (basketball club) players
Feyenoord Basketball players
Guards (basketball)